Provincial Road 314 (PR 314) is a provincial road in the eastern region of Manitoba, Canada, running through Nopiming Provincial Park.  It begins at PR 304 near the northern boundary of the park and becomes PR 315 near its southern boundary.

Provincial Roads 304, 313, 314, and 315, along with PTH 11, form a loop that provides access to several remote communities, First Nations, and provincial parks on the eastern side of Lake Winnipeg.

References

External links 
Manitoba Official Map

314